George Henson Estes Jr. (January 30, 1873 – July 2, 1969) was a United States Army officer in the late 19th and early 20th centuries.

Biography
Estes was born on January 30, 1873, in Eufaula, Alabama, the son of George Henson Estes Sr. (1848-1918) and his wife, Anna Georgia (Thornton) Estes (1853-1929). He had seven younger siblings: Mary, Edith Gray, William Thornton, Thomas Gray, Claude Hugh, Charles Richard, and Martha, who married United States Army officer John L. DeWitt.

He attended the University of Georgia before entering the United States Military Academy, which he graduated from in 1894. He was commissioned into the infantry.

Estes participated in the Santiago Campaign during the Spanish–American War, and he served in the Sanitary Corps while in Cuba. He participated in the Philippine–American War. From 1914 to 1917, he served as the treasurer and quartermaster at the USMA. On August 8, 1918, after being transferred to the Inspector General's Department, Estes was promoted to the rank of brigadier general. He graduated from the United States Army Command and General Staff College in 1920 and from the United States Army War College in 1921. On January 2, 1929, Estes was permanently promoted to brigadier general, and he served as the commandant of the United States Army Infantry School from May 4, 1929, to May 31, 1937.

Estes retired from the army on January 1, 1937, because of disabilities. He moved to Clearwater, Florida, where he lived until his death on July 2, 1969.

Personal life
Estes married Frances Farrell on January 4, 1899, and together they had two children. Frances Farrell's sister Florence was the wife of Brigadier General James Anderson Irons.

References

Bibliography

1873 births
1969 deaths
People from Eufaula, Alabama
People from Clearwater, Florida
American military personnel of the Spanish–American War
United States Army generals
Recipients of the Silver Star
United States Military Academy alumni
United States Army Command and General Staff College alumni
United States Army War College alumni
United States Army generals of World War I
United States Military Academy faculty
Military personnel from Alabama